Bjorn Opsahl (born 10 August 1968) is a Norwegian photographer, director and lecturer from Oslo. Opsahl debuted as an artist with the exhibition "Deadscapes" in 2005 at the Henie Onstad Art Centre, and followed up with "Ask the Dust" on Stenersen Museum in 2009.

Opsahl was photographer and judge on Norway's Next Top Model (season 4 & 5, all episodes)  Sweden's Next Top Model (season 4, episode 10). He was also the judge and photographer for all episodes of Norway's Miss Universe pageant in 2005.
After moving to Los Angeles in 2008, he participated in the tattoo artist Kat Von D's television show LA Ink (Season 3, episode 13). 
Opsahl teaches photography and directing at Nordic School of Photography in Oslo, and has held a number of workshops and lectures around the country since 2005.
In 2011 he started working with the Scandinavian talkshow Skavlan which ends in autumn 2014 with a book and exhibitions in Oslo and Stockholm. Opsahl are portraying Skavlan's guests backstage, and has so far worked with international celebrities such as Lionel Richie, Sir Ben Kingsley, Noel Gallagher, Petter Stordalen, Dave Grohl, Bruno Mars and Justin Bieber.  
His photos are published in international magazines such as Rolling Stone, Financial Times, 'Elle and Cosmopolitan.

Opsahl has no formal photography training, either from school or as an assistant. He started as a roadie for various festivals and rock concerts. During a lunch break from work job he went to the local convenience store to buy a sausage and five lottery tickets. He won 25,000 NOK (approximately US$5,000) and left directly for Stockholm to party. Arriving home a few days later, he had also been bought his first camera.

In 2010 he was the wedding photographer when the Norwegian Forbes-billionaire Petter Stordalen married the environmental activist Gunhild Anker Stordalen to the tune of 5 million USD in Marrakech

Bjorn Opsahl also works as a director of commercials and music videos.

Opsahl is a friend of photographer legend Anton Corbijn and has taken Corbijn's current press photos.

Exhibitions

Solo 
1995: Björk – Venice/Stockholm – Barbeint, Oslo
2005: Deadscapes – Henie-Onstad Art Centre, Bærum
2009: Ask the Dust – Stenersen Museum, Oslo
2012: Black Eye - Nordic Light International Festival of Photography, Kristiansund

Collective 
1996: Trikkehallene i Oslo – Tinagent's Arena 18:39
1998: Kuba i Oslo – Tinagent's Arena 1998
1998: Henie Onstad Kunstsenter – Christo Hommage
2002: Havnehallene, Oslo – KORK, 53 musikere møter 53 fotografer
2002: Quart-festivalen: - Opsahl/Leardini
2003: T-banen, Oslo – Undereksponert

References 

Photographers from Oslo
Living people
1968 births